Live with Moeed Pirzada is a current affairs television talk show on GNN News. It is one of the most watched news program on GNN News. It is hosted by renowned journalist Moeed Pirzada. His show tries to untangle the twists and turns of Pakistani politics, social and economic issues. It is broadcast from Karachi from 10:00 to 11:00, Monday to Thursday.

Background 
The show was launched on 28 November 2018. It is the resumption of the Tonight with Moeed Pirzada which had ended due to Moeed Pirzada leaving Dunya News and joining GNN.

Anchor 
Moeed Pirzada holds numerous achievements in his decades long stint as journalist and media person. He serves as an author for Global Village Space News. and was an author for The Express Tribune. Moeed Pirzada previously hosted Tonight with Moeed Pirzada on Dunya News.

References 

Television stations in Pakistan
Political television series